Men in Her Life is a 1931 American pre-Code drama film directed by William Beaudine and starring Lois Moran, Charles Bickford and Victor Varconi. It was based on a 1930 novel by Warner Fabian (Samuel Hopkins Adams). It was made during a brief spell Beaudine had working at Columbia Pictures. Critics considered the film one of the studio's better B releases. Part of the film was set in the Café de la Paix in Paris which was reconstructed authentically at the Columbia studios. Columbia also made a Spanish-language version of this film, entitled Hombres en mi vida.

Plot
Julia Cavanaugh (Lois Moran) is a formerly rich socialite who is heavily in debt. She meets Count Ivan Karloff (Victor Varconi), a Russian con-man, whom she hopes to marry to relieve her financial problems. They get engaged and he seduces her but when he finds out that she has no money, he abandons her.

Shortly afterwards, she meets a retired bootlegger named Flashy Madden (Charles Bickford), a rough type who offers to pay off her debts if she will teach him how to be a gentleman. She replies that she can only teach him how to behave like one, not how to be one, but she accepts the offer.

Julia is being courted by the son of a senator, Dick Webster (Don Dillaway), and although she is uncertain, she knows that it will benefit her precarious situation and finally accepts. Just as the engagement is about to be announced, Flashy tells Julia that he is in love with someone and can she help him find the words to tell her. They perform a mock proposal together and just as Flashy is about to do it for real, she tells him about her up-coming engagement. Flashy is disappointed but wishes her well.

The engagement is announced in the press and the count reads about it. He appears at Julia's apartment and attempts to blackmail her. Flashy is in an adjoining room and overhears the interchange. He tells Julia that he will take care of it and takes the money to Karloff's lodgings. An argument ensues over relinquishing  indiscreet letters from Julia and Karloff pulls out a gun and is shot by Flashy in the struggle over the gun. Flashy is arrested but refuses to say anything in order to protect Julia. He does tell his defense counsel, however, and the lawyer goes to see Julia about it. Julia agrees to testify even though it will destroy her reputation. Over Flashy's protests and outbursts in court, she gives testimony about what happened. Her fiancé is in the spectators gallery and on hearing the truth, he leaves the court and ends the engagement. Flashy is acquitted on the grounds of self-defense and is released. He decides to go to Florida and goes to say goodbye to Julia. Julia repeats the same words that Flashy had spoken to her in the mock-proposal, saying that there is a man, the greatest gentleman she has ever known, with whom she is in love and whom she doesn't know how to tell. They embrace and kiss.

Cast
 Lois Moran as Julia Cavanaugh  
 Charles Bickford as Flashy Madden  
 Victor Varconi as Count Ivan Karloff  
 Don Dillaway as Dick Webster  
 Luis Alberni as Anton  
 Adrienne D'Ambricourt as Maria  
 Barbara Weeks as Miss Mulholland  
 Wilson Benge as Wilton  
 Oscar Apfel as Blake  
 Hooper Atchley as District Attorney

Spanish-language version
Columbia produced a Spanish-language version of the film, Hombres en mi vida, which was directed by David Selman, and premiered in Los Angeles on February 13, 1932.

Spanish-language cast
 Lupe Vélez as Julia Clark
 Gilbert Roland as Jaime Gilman
 Ramón Pereda as Andrés Brennon
 Carlos Villarías as Bray, abogado defensor
 Paul Ellis as Conde Ivan Karloff
 Luis Alberni as Gaston
 Paco Moreno as Criado Williams

References

Bibliography
 Marshall, Wendy L. William Beaudine: From Silents to Television. Scarecrow Press, 2005.

External links

1931 films
American drama films
American black-and-white films
1931 drama films
1930s English-language films
Films directed by William Beaudine
Columbia Pictures films
Films with screenplays by Robert Riskin
1930s American films